The following is a list of unproduced Guillermo del Toro projects in roughly chronological order. During his decades-long career, Mexican filmmaker and author Guillermo del Toro has worked on a number of projects that never progressed beyond the pre-production stage. Some of these projects fell into development hell and are presumably canceled, while some were taken over and completed by other filmmakers.

1990s

Meat Market: A Love Story 
Meat Market, an original screenplay by del Toro, which he described as "Hamlet in a meat market, by the way of Phantom of the Opera". Del Toro wanted Ron Perlman to star in the lead role, but lost interest in pursuing the project when he believed Perlman had become too old to play the part.

The Left Hand of Darkness
In 1994, del Toro began writing an adaptation of Alexandre Dumas's The Count of Monte Cristo, which he titled The Left Hand of Darkness. His version was set in Mexico and was what he described as a "steampunk gothic western".

The List of Seven
Del Toro was attached to direct an adaptation of Mark Frost's 1993 novel The List of Seven. Frost himself wrote a draft of a screenplay before the project was cancelled.

The Sandkings
Around 1995, before directing Mimic, del Toro approached George R. R. Martin with the intent to make a film adaptation of his famous novelette Sandkings, but the project was quickly scrapped after the novel was adapted into the first episode of the television series The Outer Limits.

Domu: A Child's Dream
In the late 1990s, del Toro expressed interest in directing a live-action film adaptation of Katsuhiro Otomo's Domu: A Child's Dream. In 2002, after the success of Blade II, del Toro said that he tried to make the film in the following years, but his efforts were hamstrung by international legalities. "Goddamn it, we haven't even got the rights. We've been negotiating the rights for four years, which goes to prove Japanese lawyers are even more complex than American lawyers. The moment we have the rights I would go ahead and write it."

2000s

The Wind in the Willows
In 2003, del Toro reported that he was working with The Walt Disney Company on an animated film adaptation of Kenneth Grahame's novel The Wind in the Willows. The film would have been animated using CGI animation, but the project was abandoned following many delays. The director explained why he had to leave the helm; "It was a beautiful book, and then I went to meet with the executives and they said, 'Could you give Toad a skateboard and make him say, "radical dude" things?' and that's when I said, 'It's been a pleasure ...

Mephisto's Bridge
Del Toro wrote an adaption of Christopher Fowler's novel Spanky entitled Mephisto's Bridge. Del Toro wrote the first draft of the script in 1994 and the film nearly went into production in the mid-2000s, but it did not go beyond pre-production.

Tarzan
On December 15, 2006, ComingSoon.net reported that del Toro was in talks to direct a Tarzan film. Then, in September 2008, Slashfilm.com reported that Stephen Sommers had replaced del Toro as director. Another film version, released in 2016 under the title The Legend of Tarzan, was directed by David Yates.

Born
In 2007, it was announced that del Toro would produce Born, a film using a combination of live action and stop-motion and elements from movies like The Sixth Sense, The Wicker Man, Rosemary's Baby, and Straw Dogs. Alongside del Toro, Lawrence Gordon and Lloyd Levin were listed as producers, with Clive Barker executive producing. Jennifer Connelly and Paul Bettany were set to star as husband and pregnant wife move, whose lives are shattered when the husband's Claymation cartoons start to come to life and reenact his nightmares. The Chiodo Brothers, known for Killer Klowns from Outer Space, were set to create the animation.

The Orphanage remake
In 2007, New Line Cinema bought the rights to produce an English-language remake with del Toro as producer. On remakes, the original's director J. A. Bayona noted that "The Americans have all the money in the world but can't do anything, while we can do whatever we want but don't have the money" and "The American industry doesn't take chances, that's why they make remakes of movies that were already big hits". On August 4, 2009, Larry Fessenden was announced as the director of the American remake. Fessenden later announced that he would not be involved with directing the remake, stating "Working on the script with Guillermo was a very exciting experience, but then I got into a casting miasma and that's where the thing is; I think they're gonna do it another way, actually. So I think I'm out of it. Hopefully they'll still use my script, but I'm not sure I'm directing it anymore". In January 2010, Mark Pellington replaced Larry Fessenden as director of the project.

On August 5, 2011, Guillermo del Toro stated that the remake would reflect his original vision for the film, and that it had been planned even when the first version was in production. "Even when we produced the Spanish movie, I had intended to remake it because we had a very different screenplay that, because of money and time, got turned into the movie you saw – which is great, but there was this other structure for the original script that I wanted to try. So even before we shot the first film it was an economic decision, a pre-existing creative decision, to change it." Del Toro also praised the new film's director. "We have Mark Pellington attached as director – I'm a big fan of his The Mothman Prophecies and his video work – and we are out to actors, so we're hoping to get things going soon." On August 30, 2011, it was reported that American actress Amy Adams was in talks to star as Laura, the main character, who was played by Belén Rueda in the original film. It was also stated that the current incarnation of the remake screenplay had been written by Larry Fessenden and Sergio G. Sánchez, the sole writer of the original film.

3993 
On November 8, 2007, ComingSoon.net reported that del Toro was working on a spiritual sequel to Pan's Labyrinth, titled 3993 and intended to be the third and final installment of a Spanish Civil War film trilogy. However, del Toro scrapped the project after deciding to direct Hellboy II: The Golden Army. In October 2022, del Toro confirmed that Pinocchio was the last in the Childhood and War trilogy.

Death: The High Cost of Living
In 2008, a film based on Death: The High Cost of Living, to be called Death and Me, was under production at New Line Cinema. Neil Gaiman wrote the screenplay, and would also direct, with del Toro as executive producer. Gaiman spent several days on the set of del Toro's film Hellboy II: The Golden Army to get pointers on how to direct. On October 14, 2010 it was reported in an interview with Gaiman that as of June or July, DC and Warner Bros. had closed down work on the film.

Halo
On February 8, 2008, it was reported that del Toro was in talks to direct a film adaptation of the Halo video game series. However, he chose instead to focus on The Hobbit film adaptation.

Hater
On May 20, 2008, del Toro revealed that he was set to produce J.A. Bayona's film adaptation of Hater by David Moody.

Hellboy III
On July 10, 2008, del Toro expressed his interest in directing a third Hellboy film, saying that he would work on the film after finishing The Hobbit. In 2010, during the production of the unmade At the Mountain of Madness, del Toro mentioned that he would direct Hellboy III after his next project, even though the script was not yet written. However, on July 8, 2013, del Toro said that the film was unlikely to be released, and suggested the possibility of telling its story in comic book form. Hellboy creator Mike Mignola refused to accept the idea.

In a Reddit AMA on July 11, 2014, del Toro said:Well, you know, we don't have that movie on the horizon, but the idea for it was to have Hellboy finally come to terms with the fact that his destiny, his inevitable destiny, is to become the beast of the Apocalypse, and having him and Liz face the sort of, that part of his nature, and he has to do it, in order to be able to ironically vanquish the foe that he has to face in the 3rd film. He has to become the beast of the Apocalypse to be able to defend humanity, but at the same time, he becomes a much darker being. It's a very interesting ending to the series, but I don't think it will happen. ... We have gone through basically every studio and asked for financing, and they are not interested. I think that the first movie made its budget back, and a little bit of profit, but then it was very very big on video and DVD. The story repeated itself with the second already, it made its money back at the box office, but a small margin of profit in the release of the theatrical print, but was very very big on DVD and video. Sadly now from a business point of view all the studios know is that you don't have that safety net of the DVD and video, so they view the project as dangerous."

On September 26, 2016, Ron Perlman stated on Twitter that he was working on a new Hellboy film, but that del Toro was unlikely to return. On February 21, 2017, del Toro announced on Twitter that the third Hellboy movie had been scrapped. A reboot was released in April 2019 with no involvement from del Toro.

In July 2019, Perlman said that he would still love to finish the trilogy with del Toro, ignoring the reboot, and that he thought it could happen if financing could be found.

2010s

Hellboy: Silverlance
In 2010, Hellboy screenwriter Peter Briggs was asked by Universal to script a spin-off centring on Prince Nuada, and provisionally agreed that Briggs could direct the film in New Zealand. Briggs began work on an outline with co-writer Aaron Mason. Titled Hellboy: Silverlance, the script was a B.P.R.D. story featuring Abe Sapien as the main character with Hellboy in a supporting role. Moving into the new B.P.R.D. headquarters in Colorado, Abe is troubled by his psychic connection with Princess Nuala, and begins researching the elves' history. The film would have shown Nuada's adventures throughout history, including his rivalry with a fairy courtier who orchestrates Nuada's exile in hopes of marrying Nuala and seizing control of the fairy kingdom; Nuada first meeting Mister Wink by saving him from a troupe of soldiers during the Spanish Inquisition; and Nuada in Nazi Germany, engineering a pact to keep various supernatural entities safe during World War II (with Nuada and Kroenen fighting in a "friendly" match for Project Ragnarok men.) Doug Jones would have played both Abe and the Angel of Death, who strikes a bargain with Nuada. Rupert Evans's Agent Myers would also have returned. The story climaxed at the new B.P.R.D. headquarters, with the return of Rasputin's summoning gauntlet. Universal wanted to proceed with the project, but it emerged that del Toro's Hellboy 3 was still a possibility, so Silverlance was shelved. In 2015, Briggs received another call from Universal, saying that Hellboy 3 had been cancelled and asking him and Mason to return for a reworked Silverlance, with producers del Toro and Lawrence Gordon involved. The caveat was that Hellboy could not appear, but the writers managed to get the character a cameo appearance at the climax. If successful, the film would have launched a From the Files of the B.P.R.D. spin-off series. In May 2017, Briggs affirmed that, with the announcement of the Hellboy reboot, the Silverlance project was dead.

Drood
On June 1, 2010, MTV News reported that del Toro was set to direct a film adaptation of Drood, a novel by Dan Simmons, for Universal Pictures.

Untitled Van Helsing project
On June 10, 2010, del Toro stated that he was working on an untitled film about Van Helsing,

At the Mountains of Madness
On July 28, 2010, del Toro announced that he would direct a film adaptation of H. P. Lovecraft's At the Mountains of Madness for Universal Pictures, with Canadian film director James Cameron as producer. The movie was originally set up as a DreamWorks project in 2004, but was later cancelled. Cameron suggested casting Tom Cruise in the lead role and releasing the film in 3-D.

In June 2010, del Toro said that the adaptation probably would not happen at all. He stated, "It doesn't look like I can do it. It's very difficult for the studios to take the step of doing a period-set, R-rated, tentpole movie with a tough ending and no love story. Lovecraft has a readership as big as any best-seller, but it's tough to quantify because his works are in the public domain." Cameron and Del Toro put forward the idea to Universal, who greenlit it. Earlier that same year, del Toro had also asked S. T. Joshi if he wanted to be a consultant once the movie got into production. However, due to many delays, Cameron and del Toro left the project after del Toro realized that the film would have been very similar to Ridley Scott's 2012 film Prometheus.

The Haunted Mansion
It was announced on July 22, 2010 at San Diego Comic-Con International that a new film based on Disney's The Haunted Mansion was in development with del Toro writing and producing. Del Toro saw the 2003 film with his daughters; when asked about his involvement in the new project, he said, "The thing I want to do is remake it." Elaborating, he commented, "The movie I see in my head of Haunted Mansion is not, I believe, what everyone is imagining it to be. It's not just a regular world with a haunted mansion plopped in the middle. I really am thinking of a movie that has a heightened reality."  Del Toro said that Hatbox Ghost would be the main haunting and added, "We are not making it a comedy. We are making it scary and fun at the same time, but the scary will be scary."  It is to be filmed in live-action 3D. To help make a respectful adaptation, del Toro has contacted Walt Disney World Imagineer Jason Surrell, author of The Haunted Mansion: From the Magic Kingdom to the Movies, to act as a possible consultant for the film. Del Toro has also announced he is aiming for a PG-13 rating for The Haunted Mansion. On August 7, 2012, Del Toro mentioned in an interview with Collider that he had submitted his final draft to Disney, and that "they like the screenplay" because "their reaction to the draft was good". Del Toro revealed that he will co-write the film, but will not direct it. On April 9, 2015, Variety reported that Ryan Gosling is in talks to star in the film and D.V. DeVincentis will work on the film's script. On September 4, 2016, Brigham Taylor signed on to co-produce the film. In August 2019, del Toro stated that he was unsure if the film would be produced though he had a good feeling about the scripts. "My gauging of interest is moot but I would love to see a "Haunted Mansion" movie by someone who loves it".

Alma
In October 2010, it was announced that DreamWorks Animation is developing an animated feature film based on the short film Alma. Short's director Rodrigo Blaas was set to direct the feature, with Guillermo del Toro executive producing it. In November 2011, it was reported that the studio hired Megan Holley, a writer of Sunshine Cleaning, to write the script. Del Toro, who was also helping with the story and the design work, said in June 2012 that the film was in visual development. However, the project was likely abandoned due to del Toro's commitment to other projects.

Insane
On December 11, 2010, at the Spike Video Game Awards, del Toro reported that he was working on a video game entitled Insane, planned for release in 2013. Two days later, he revealed that the game was to be the first entry of an Insane video game trilogy. On March 11, 2011, Fanboy Confidential reported that Guy Davis, who previously worked on del Toro's unmade adaptation of At the Mountains of Madness, was working as key designer. However, on August 16, 2012, IGN reported that the video game was cancelled by the publisher THQ. Despite this, three months later del Toro stated that the game could still happen.

Pan
At one point, del Toro was set to direct a modern version of Peter Pan for New Line Cinema, in which Hook starred as a former detective trying to track down a child killer version of Peter Pan. However, other commitments and the troubles for New Line prevented him from taking the job.

Beauty and the Beast
On July 18, 2011, TheFilmStage reported that del Toro was developing a live-action film of the classic fairy tale and Disney film Beauty and the Beast, with Emma Watson to star as Belle and Denise Di Novi to co-produce. However, del Toro's adaptation never materialized, though Watson did play the role of Belle in The Walt Disney Company's 2017 live-action remake.

The Bloody Benders
On April 27, 2012, Deadline Hollywood reported that del Toro was involved in the development of a biopic about serial killers The Bloody Benders.

The Hulk
By 2010, del Toro was in talks with Marvel Television to make a TV series titled The Hulk. The series was intended to be aired on ABC. However, after Mark Ruffalo's performance as the Incredible Hulk in The Avengers (2012), the project was put on hold.

Justice League Dark
On January 15, 2013, del Toro confirmed his involvement in a live-action film adaptation of the Justice League Dark comic series. While Warner Bros. was considering greenlighting the film's production, and reviewing the script written by Michael Gilio, del Toro revealed that the working title was Dark Universe and that the film would feature appearances by John Constantine, Swamp Thing, The Spectre, Deadman and others. Del Toro later expressed interest in casting Matt Ryan as John Constantine, saying that the Constantine TV series could coexist with the DC Extended Universe, because he felt that it could work well, but when the series was not renewed for a second season due to poor ratings, del Toro scrapped the idea. In December 2014, one month after Warner Bros. reviewed his script, del Toro confirmed that the film would be part of the DC Extended Universe. In October 2015, it was officially reported that del Toro had left the project.

Monster 
In 2013, it was revealed that del Toro and HBO were collaborating on a pilot for a live-action TV series based on Naoki Urasawa's manga Monster. Co-executive producer Stephen Thompson was writing the pilot, while del Toro was to direct it and be an executive producer alongside Don Murphy and Susan Montford. In 2015, del Toro told Latino-Review that HBO had passed on the project and that they were in the process of pitching to other studios.

Frankenstein
In 2014, del Toro mentioned that an adaptation of Frankenstein was one of his dream projects, and that Donna Langley from Universal Pictures had approached him to direct. While no official plans ever became clear, he stated that if he ever got around to do it, he would want to focus on the film exclusively while making it. If made, he says it will not be a direct adaptation of Mary Shelley's novel, but an adventure story that involves the monster. In July 2020, in an interview promoting the film Antlers, he stated that if he had the funding, he would make an adaptation of Frankenstein that would span two to three films due to the book's complexity and changing points of view. In October 2020, Doug Jones stated in an interview that he and del Toro shot makeup tests for the monster and that he described del Toro's interpretation as "hauntingly beautiful". Jones stated that the monster's design was based on Bernie Wrightson's art, sighting del Toro as a big fan of Wrightson. Jones also commented that the main reason the project was shelved was due to Universal's future plans for their Dark Universe franchise. In 2023, the project was revived by Netflix, who del Toro had signed multi-year deal with to produce projects. Following the win of his Pinocchio film at the 95th Academy Awards for best animated feature, Variety revealed that he is set to write and direct the feature with Andrew Garfield, Oscar Isaac and Mia Goth in early talks for potential roles.

Silent Hills
On August 12, 2014, Hero complex reported that del Toro was working with game director Hideo Kojima on the PlayStation 4 video game Silent Hills, the ninth installment in the Silent Hill video game series. However, on April 26, 2015, del Toro stated via IGN that he was no longer working with Kojima on Silent Hills and that the project had been cancelled. Then, on July 24, del Toro stated via his Twitter account that he and Kojima were still working on a new untitled project, which later became Death Stranding. In an interview with Shacknews, del Toro said that he would never again get involved in video games after his past experiences. I have proven to be the albatross of video games. I joined THQ, and THQ goes broke. I join Kojima, and Kojima leaves Konami, because Metal Gear. I have decided, in order not to destroy anyone else's life, I have decided I will never again get involved in video games. Otherwise, I'll join someone and his house will explode, or something.

Fantastic Voyage 
On January 7, 2016, it was revealed that del Toro is attached to direct a remake of Richard Fleischer's Fantastic Voyage for 20th Century Fox, along with the announcement that David S. Goyer and Justin Rhodes will be the writers and James Cameron will produce the film with his production company Lightstorm Entertainment. In August 2017, it was reported that del Toro had postponed working on the film to completely focus on his film The Shape of Water.

References 

Toro, Guillermo del
Works by Guillermo del Toro